The .600 Overkill is a hunting cartridge designed to fit the CZ-550 action, by American Hunting Rifles.

Design
The .600 Overkill was designed by Robert Garnick of Las Vegas, Nevada. The case is a custom, with a belt, .683 in (17.35 mm), added for headspacing and the rim to fit that of the .505 Gibbs .640 in-(16.26 mm) size, bolt face.

This cartridge was intended to fire the largest bullet able to fit in the CZ-550, and was designed specifically for the purpose of killing an elephant. The CZ-550 is able to fit two cartridges, with slight alterations. 

References

Pistol and rifle cartridges